A fissure vent, also known as a volcanic fissure, eruption fissure or simply a fissure, is a linear volcanic vent through which lava erupts, usually without any explosive activity. The vent is often a few metres wide and may be many kilometres long. Fissure vents can cause large flood basalts which run first in lava channels and later in lava tubes. After some time, the eruption tends to become focused at one or more spatter cones. Small fissure vents may not be easily discernible from the air, but the crater rows (see Laki) or the canyons (see Eldgjá) built up by some of them are.

The dikes that feed fissures reach the surface from depths of a few kilometers and connect them to deeper magma reservoirs, often under volcanic centers. Fissures are usually found in or along rifts and rift zones, such as Iceland and the East African Rift. Fissure vents are often part of the structure of shield volcanoes.

Iceland

In Iceland, volcanic vents, which can be long fissures, often open parallel to the rift zones where the Eurasian and the North American Plate lithospheric plates are diverging, a system which is part of the Mid-Atlantic Ridge. Renewed eruptions generally occur from new parallel fractures offset by a few hundred to thousands of metres from the earlier fissures. This distribution of vents and sometimes voluminous eruptions of fluid basaltic lava usually builds up a thick lava plateau, rather than a single volcanic edifice. But there are also the central volcanoes, composite volcanoes, often with calderas, which have been formed during thousands of years, and eruptions with one or more magma reservoirs underneath controlling their respective fissure system.

The Laki fissures, part of the Grímsvötn volcanic system, produced one of the biggest effusive eruptions on earth in historical times, in the form of a flood basalt of 12–14 km3 of lava in 1783.  During the Eldgjá eruption A.D. 934–40, another very big effusive fissure eruption in the volcanic system of Katla in South Iceland, ~18 km3 (4.7 mi3) of lava were released. In September 2014, a fissure eruption was ongoing on the site of the 18th century lava field Holuhraun. The eruption is part of an eruption series in the Bárðarbunga volcanic system.

Hawaii

The radial fissure vents of Hawaiian volcanoes also produce "curtains of fire" as lava fountains erupting along a portion of a fissure. These vents build up low ramparts of basaltic spatter on both sides of the fissure. More isolated lava fountains along the fissure produce crater rows of small spatter and cinder cones. The fragments that form a spatter cone are hot and plastic enough to weld together, while the fragments that form a cinder cone remain separate because of their lower temperature.

List of fissure vents

References

External links

Detailed list and KML files for Fissure Vents
Volcanolive.com Page on Fissure Vents

 
Lists of coordinates